The 2022 Hammersmith and Fulham London Borough Council election took place on 5 May 2022. All 50 members of Hammersmith and Fulham London Borough Council were elected. The elections took place alongside local elections in the other London boroughs and elections to local authorities across the United Kingdom.

The election took place under new election boundaries, which will increase the number of councillors from 46 to 50. The Labour Party maintained control of the council, which it had held since 2014.

Background

History 

The thirty-two London boroughs were established in 1965 by the London Government Act 1963. They are the principal authorities in Greater London and have responsibilities including education, housing, planning, highways, social services, libraries, recreation, waste, environmental health and revenue collection. Some of the powers are shared with the Greater London Authority, which also manages passenger transport, police and fire.

Since its formation, Hammersmith and Fulham has been under Labour control, Conservative control or no overall control. The council has had a Labour majority since the 2014 election in which Labour won 26 seats to the Conservatives' 20. In the most recent election in 2018, Labour extended their majority to 35 seats with 52.0% of the vote, while the Conservatives won 11 seats with 34.7% of the vote. The Liberal Democrats received 11.2% of the vote across the borough but won no seats. The incumbent leader of the council is the Labour councillor Stephen Cowan, who has held that position since 2014.

Council term 
In 2019, a Labour councillor for Fulham Broadway, Alan De'Ath, resigned as he had taken a politically restricted job. A by-election to replace him was held on 19 September 2019, which was won by the Labour candidate Helen Rowbottom, an NHS service manager. The Liberal Democrats saw a significant increase in their vote share for the seat. A Labour councillor for Wormholt and White City, Colin Aherne, died in July 2021. Aherne had served as a councillor for the area since 1986. A by-election for the ward was held in September 2021, which was won by the Labour candidate Frances Umeh, who worked as a communications professional.

Electoral process 
Hammersmith and Fulham, like other London borough councils, elects all of its councillors at once every four years. The previous election took place in 2018. The election will take place by multi-member first-past-the-post voting, with each ward being represented by two or three councillors. Electors will have as many votes as there are councillors to be elected in their ward, with the top two or three being elected.

All registered electors (British, Irish, Commonwealth and European Union citizens) living in London aged 18 or over will be entitled to vote in the election. People who live at two addresses in different councils, such as university students with different term-time and holiday addresses, are entitled to be registered for and vote in elections in both local authorities. Voting in-person at polling stations will take place from 7:00 to 22:00 on election day, and voters will be able to apply for postal votes or proxy votes in advance of the election.

Previous council composition

Results summary

Ward results

Addison

Avonmore

Brook Green

College Park & Old Oak

Coningham

Fulham Reach

Fulham Town

Grove

Hammersmith Broadway

Lillie

Munster

Palace & Hurlingham

Parsons Green & Sandford

Ravenscourt

Sands End

Shepherd's Bush Green

Walham Green

Wendell Park

West Kensington

White City

Wormholt

References 

Council elections in the London Borough of Hammersmith and Fulham
Hammersmith and Fulham